This is a list of notable Jewish American chemists.  For other Jewish Americans, see Lists of Jewish Americans.

 Sidney Altman, chemist, Nobel Prize (1989)
 Christian B. Anfinsen, biochemist, Nobel Prize (1972) (converted)
 Allen J. Bard, electrochemist, inventor of scanning electrochemical microscope, Wolf Prize (2008)
 Paul Berg, biochemist, Nobel Prize (1980)
 Walter Gilbert, DNA sequencing, Nobel Prize (1980)
 Herbert A. Hauptman, chemist, Nobel Prize (1985)
 Roald Hoffmann (1937–), chemist and writer, Nobel Prize winner (1981)
 Martin Kamen, carbon-14
 Jacob A. Marinsky, discovered promethium
 Alexander Pines, physical chemist, Wolf Prize (1991)
 Martin Pope (1918–2022), physical chemist, Davy Medal (2006)
Murray Eden (1920–2020), physical chemist
 William Stein, biochemist, Nobel Prize (1972)

References

Chemists
Chemists